Horkelia clevelandii is a species of flowering plant in the rose family known by the common name Cleveland's horkelia. It is native to the Peninsular Ranges of southern California and northern Baja California. This is a perennial herb forming clumps of long, fernlike leaves and erect stems. The leaves are up to 18 centimeters long and are made up of triangular to rounded leaflets, each toothed or lobed and covered in thin hairs. The narrow stems reach 10 to 50 centimeters in height and bear inflorescences of several flowers. Each flower has hairy, lance-shaped bractlets and pointed sepals. The narrow oval petals are white. The center of the flower contains ten stamens and up to 50 pistils.

Its specific epithet clevelandii honors 19th-century San Diego-based plant collector and lawyer Daniel Cleveland.

References

External links
Jepson Manual Treatment
Photo gallery

clevelandii
Flora of Baja California
Flora of California